Tachognya (also spelled Tachogña), also known as the Blue Site, is a prehistoric village site on the island of Saipan in the Northern Mariana Islands.  It is located near the "Blue Beach" landing site of Allied forces in the Battle of Saipan, from which its name is derived.  The site consists of ten latte stone house foundations, the largest of which has twelve latte columns and measures .

The site was listed on the United States National Register of Historic Places in 1986.

See also
National Register of Historic Places listings in the Northern Mariana Islands

References

Archaeological sites on the National Register of Historic Places in the Northern Mariana Islands
Saipan